SIFL or Sifl may refer to:

Sifl, a character from The Sifl and Olly Show
Southern Indoor Football League